In the United Kingdom, the term listed building refers to a building or other structure officially designated as being of special architectural, historical, or cultural significance; Grade II* structures are those considered to be "particularly important buildings of more than special interest". Listing was begun by a provision in the Town and Country Planning Act 1947. Once listed, strict limitations are imposed on the modifications allowed to a building's structure or fittings. In Wales, the authority for listing under the Planning (Listed Buildings and Conservation Areas) Act 1990 rests with Cadw.

Buildings

|}

Notes

See also

 Grade I listed buildings in the Vale of Glamorgan
 Listed buildings in the Vale of Glamorgan
 List of scheduled monuments in the Vale of Glamorgan
 Registered historic parks and gardens in the Vale of Glamorgan

References

External links

 
Vale of Glamorgan II*